is a Japanese professional footballer who plays as a left back for  club Urawa Red Diamonds.

Club statistics
.

References

External links
 Takuya Ogiwara at J.LEAGUE Data Site 
 Takuya Ogiwara at J.LEAGUE.jp (archive) 
 Takuya Ogiwara at Urawa Red Diamonds 

1999 births
Living people
Japanese footballers
Association football midfielders
Association football people from Saitama Prefecture
Urawa Red Diamonds players
Kyoto Sanga FC players
J1 League players